The Northeast Mississippi Daily Journal is the largest daily newspaper in northeast Mississippi. It was first published in 1872. It is based in Tupelo, Mississippi, and owned by Journal, Inc. (formerly known as Journal Publishing Company, Inc.) which also owns eight weekly community newspapers such as The Itawamba County Times, the Pontotoc Progress, the Southern Sentinel, the Chickasaw Journal and the New Albany News-Exchange.

References

External links
 Daily Journal, Caleb Bedillion selected for ProPublica's Local Reporting Network
 Tupelo native Sam R. Hall to lead Daily Journal newsroom
 Daily Journal wins 36 Mississippi Press awards, including General Excellence
 Official website

Newspapers published in Mississippi